Gorzów Wielkopolski Voivodeship was a unit of administrative division and local government in Poland between 1975 and 1998 when it was superseded by Lubusz Voivodeship. Its capital city was Gorzów Wielkopolski.

Major cities and towns (population in 1998)
Gorzów Wielkopolski - 126 019
Międzyrzecz - 20 155
Słubice - 17 637
Kostrzyn nad Odrą - 17 500
Choszczno - 16 053
Barlinek - 15 134
Dębno - 14 405
Myślibórz - 12 676
Międzychód - 11 224
Drezdenko - 10 600
Skwierzyna - 10 477
Strzelce Krajeńskie - 10 299
Sulęcin - 10 071

See also
 Voivodeships of Poland

Former voivodeships of Poland (1975–1998)